Four ships and two shore establishments of the Royal Navy have borne the name HMS Forward:

Ships
 was a 12-gun gun-brig launched in 1805 and sold in 1815.
 was an  wooden screw gunboat launched in 1855 and sold in 1869.
 was a composite screw gunboat launched in 1877. She became a coal hulk in 1892 and was sold in 1904.
 was a  scout cruiser launched in 1904 and sold in 1921.

Shore establishments
 was the name given to the Navy's base at Newhaven. It was commissioned on 25 August 1939 and paid off in 1945.
HMS Forward II was the Coastal Forces base at Newhaven between 1941 and 1942, when it was renamed . 
 is a Royal Naval Reserve unit and communications training centre in Birmingham. It was commissioned in 1984 and is currently active.

Royal Navy ship names